Bernard Leo Burmester (February 1, 1945 – June 28, 2007) was an American actor. Burmester worked for director John Sayles several times, including in Passion Fish (1992) and Lone Star (1996), and also for directors such as John Schlesinger and Sidney Lumet, and as the Apostle Nathaniel in Martin Scorsese's The Last Temptation of Christ (1988).   He also starred in the CBS sitcom Flo as Randy Stumphill, the mechanic who frequented the bar.

Life and career
Burmester was born and raised in Louisville, Kentucky, and studied at Western Kentucky University as a biology major before switching to drama. He worked summer stock at Shawnee Summer Theatre of Greene County, Indiana.  After receiving an MFA from the University of Denver, he taught college for a year before becoming a working actor.

Burmester appeared with the Actors Theatre of Louisville, originating roles in the plays Getting Out and Lone Star, and eventually recreating them in his Off-Broadway and Broadway debuts, respectively. He made his feature film debut in a big budget project with Cruising (1980), and had a featured role as the mortuary director in Honky Tonk Freeway (1981). Burmester played one of the FBI agents hounding the faux Rosenberg couple in Daniel (1983). In 1986 he played the booming villain General D. in Broadway's Raggedy Ann: The Musical Adventure. He played the role of Thénardier in the Original Broadway production of Les Misérables and the Police Sergeant in Harry Connick, Jr.'s musical Thou Shalt not.

He played Holly Hunter's character's father in the prologue of Broadcast News (1987), and the bum in front of The Plaza in Big Business (1988). Roles started to get larger with James Cameron's The Abyss (1989), as Catfish DeVries, decompression expert.

Although he was thought to have died of leukemia, his death was caused by a tick bite that was complicated by his compromised immune system. He died at age 62 on June 28, 2007. His ashes were scattered in Kentucky.

Filmography

 Cruising (1980) – Water Sport
 Honky Tonk Freeway (1981) – Mortuary Director
 Daniel (1983) – FBI Agent #1
 The House of God (1984) – Dr. Gath
 Odd Jobs (1986) – Wylie D. Daiken
 Sweet Liberty (1986) – Hank
 Broadcast News (1987) – Jane's Dad
 Big Business (1988) – Bum
 The Last Temptation of Christ (1988) – Nathaniel, Apostle
 The Abyss (1989) – 'Catfish' De Vries
 Article 99 (1992) – 'Shooter' Polaski
 Passion Fish (1992) – Reeves
 Innocent Blood (1992) – Dave Flinton
  (1992) – Rickey Tick
 A Perfect World (1993) - Deputy Tom Adler
 The Neon Bible (1995) – Bobbie Lee Taylor
 Lone Star (1996) – Cody
 The Devil's Advocate (1997) – Florida Prosecutor
 Switchback (1997) – Clyde 'Shorty' Callahan
 The Secret of Mulan (1998) – (voice)
 River Red (1998) – Judge Perkins
 The Farmhouse (1998) – Dallas Miller
 Getting to Know You (1999) – Lamar Pike, Sr.
 Saturn (1999) – Dad
 Limbo (1999) – Harmon King
 Dumbarton Bridge (1999) – Jack
 The End of the Bar (2002) – Boxing Trainer
 City by the Sea (2002) – Lieutenant Katt
 Out of These Rooms (2002) – Kit's Dad
 Gangs of New York (2002) – Telegraph Operator No. 1 (voice)
 The Red Betsy (2003) – Emmet Rounds
 America Brown (2004) – Bo Williams
 Patch (2005) – Mr. Moynahan
 The Legend of Zorro (2005) – Colonel Beauregard
 Aftermath (2013) – Sheriff (final film role)

Broadway appearances

 The Fantasticks (2006) – Hucklebee
 Lone Star (1979)
 Big River (1985)
 Raggedy Ann (1986)
 Les Misérables (1987) – Thenardier
 Buried Child (1996)
 Ah, Wilderness (1998)
 The Civil War (1999)
 Thou Shalt Not (2001) – The Police Officer
 Urban Cowboy (2003)

TV appearances
Partial list

 Rattlesnake In A Cooler (1982) - The doctor/prisoner
Young Riders,episode The Initiation
 Walker, Texas Ranger – "An Innocent Man" (1993) – Woodrow Jonathan Wilton
 Alex Haley's Queen (1993) – Henderson
 Law & Order – "Snatched" (1994) – Lester Hastings
 Law & Order – "Charm City: Part 1" (1996) – Mr. Le Clair
 Shake, Rattle and Roll: An American Love Story (1999) – Corby Judd (Part 1)
 Law & Order: Criminal Intent – "The Third Horseman" (2002) – Lorne Cutler
 Law & Order – "Patriot" (2002) – Lester Hastings
 Carry Me Home – "Grizzle" (2004) – Grizzle

References

External links

1945 births
2007 deaths
American male film actors
American male stage actors
American male television actors
Deaths from cancer in New York (state)
Deaths from leukemia
Male actors from Louisville, Kentucky
Western Kentucky University alumni
20th-century American male actors
21st-century American male actors